Steven Pieter Marie de Vreeze  (born 23 September 1951 in Utrecht) is a Dutch politician who is a mayor in the Netherlands. He served in several municipalities, until 2016 in Oude IJsselstreek as interim mayor.

References

1951 births
Living people
Mayors in North Holland
Politicians from Utrecht (city)
Mayors in Gelderland